Stuhlinger Ice Piedmont is a coastal ice piedmont, about 10 nautical miles (18 km) long and wide, located immediately north of Bowers Mountains and between the lower ends of Gannutz and Barber Glaciers. Mapped by United States Geological Survey (USGS) from surveys and U.S. Navy air photos, 1960–62. Named by Advisory Committee on Antarctic Names (US-ACAN) in 1968 for Ernst Stuhlinger, National Aeronautics and Space Administration, a member of the U.S. National Science Foundation's Advisory Panel for Antarctic Programs.

Ice piedmonts of Antarctica
Landforms of Victoria Land
Pennell Coast